is a Japanese yōkai, or supernatural being, in the Gazu Hyakki Yagyō by Toriyama Sekien and in various emakimono such as the Matsui Library's Hyakki Yagyō Emaki.

Overview
In yōkai depictions, they are depicted looking like a giant biwa hōshi standing above the sea holding a rod in the right hand and carrying a pipa on their back. The  researcher  considers it a  that has existed only in these paintings.

In books published in the postwar era, there has been the interpretation that this is a kind of umibōzu, which frequently appear off the coast of Sanriku, Rikuchū Province (now Iwate prefecture). They walk around on top of the water, threaten fishermen and beckon ships to make them capsize, and sometimes even swallow ships whole. However, it is said that if the 's words are answered properly, then it will go away.

References

Mythological aquatic creatures
Yōkai